The soundtrack was composed by David Arnold and played by the Sinfonia of London and conducted by Nicholas Dodd for the 1994 film, Stargate. It was the second motion picture Arnold had composed and the first major motion picture. At the time of Stargate's production, David Arnold had recently started to work in a local video store in London. Once he got the job, he spent several months in a hotel room working on the soundtrack, spending more time rewriting the music and improving it as delays were being created due to film companies trying to get the rights to release the film. The last 30–40 seconds of the track 'Entering The Stargate' was used several times in the Closing Ceremony of the London 2012 Olympic Games as Arnold was the musical director of the event. Other selections of the score, most notably the "Overture" and "Closing Titles intro," were also used in trailers for other films including Waterworld (1995), Jumanji (1995), Independence Day (1996),  Dragonheart (1996), The Man in the Iron Mask (1998), Lost in Space (1998), The Mummy (1999), Dungeons & Dragons (2000), The Time Machine (2002), The Polar Express (2004), Chicken Little (2005) and Nim's Island (2008).

Track listings

Running Time: 65 minutes.

Stargate: deluxe edition soundtrack
In October 2006, a deluxe edition was released, which included seven new tracks adding eight minutes of audio bringing the running time up to 73 minutes.

The new tracks added were:
 Wild Abduction - Track 02
 Bomb Assembly - Track 11
 Eye of Ra - Track 16
 Execution - Track 28
 Against the Gods - Track 30
 Transporter Horror - Track 34
 Closing Titles (Intro) - Track 37

Stargate: 25th Anniversary Expanded Limited Edition
In December 2019, La-La Land Records issued a 2-disc set featuring the complete film score and additional music.

References

Stargate
1994 soundtrack albums
David Arnold soundtracks
Science fiction film soundtracks
Adventure film soundtracks

fr:Stargate, la porte des étoiles#Bande originale